Remon van de Hare (born 23 May 1982) is a Dutch former professional basketball player. He is  7'3.25" (2.22 m) tall and played as center. He was picked in the second round of the 2003 NBA draft by the Toronto Raptors, but never played a game in the NBA. Van de Hare was also a member of the Dutch national basketball team in 2008. Van de Hare retired on 31 December 2009.

External links
Remon van de Hare profile at Eurobasket.com
His page at The Tallest Man.com

Notes

1982 births
Living people
AEK Larnaca B.C. players
AEL Limassol B.C. players
BC Azovmash players
Centers (basketball)
Dutch expatriate basketball people in Slovenia
Dutch expatriate basketball people in Spain
Dutch expatriate basketball people in Cyprus
Dutch expatriate basketball people in Greece
Dutch men's basketball players
FC Barcelona Bàsquet players
KK Olimpija players
Liga ACB players
Basketball players from Amsterdam
Toronto Raptors draft picks
Dutch expatriate basketball people in Ukraine